Shyrokyne or Shirokino is a village in the Mariupol Raion of Donetsk Oblast, Ukraine.

War in Donbas

The village became a battleground in 2014–15 during a war between separatists affiliated with the Donetsk People's Republic and the Ukrainian government. 

Prior to the war, the village was situated in Novoazovsk Raion. This was changed on 9 December 2014, when the Ukrainian parliament voted to change the boundaries of the Raion, so as to allow Ukrainian-controlled territories to be separated from DPR-controlled territories. The village and its neighbours were thus placed into an expanded Volnovakha Raion.

All civilians were evacuated from the village in February 2015, with up to 80% of the village's houses damaged beyond repair by July of that year.

By the end of February 2016 Ukrainian troops took the village under their control as pro-Russian forces withdrew from the settlement.

As of January 2023, Shyrokyne is under occupation by Russian forces, who have annexed Donetsk Oblast.

References

Villages in Mariupol Raion